Simeon James Rice (born February 24, 1974) is a former American football defensive end. He was drafted by the Arizona Cardinals third overall in the 1996 NFL Draft.

In his 12-year NFL career, Rice recorded 122 sacks, forced 25 fumbles, recovered 8, and intercepted 5 passes. His sacks rank 20th all-time in NFL. In his first eight out of 10 seasons in the NFL, Rice recorded at least 10 sacks and in three of those seasons he recorded at least 15 sacks. He earned three Pro Bowl selections and earned a Super Bowl ring with the Tampa Bay Buccaneers in Super Bowl XXXVII, beating the Oakland Raiders. He has also played for the Denver Broncos, Indianapolis Colts and New York Sentinels.

Early years
Rice attended Mount Carmel High School on Chicago's south side, the same school as former NFL quarterback Donovan McNabb and former NBA star Antoine Walker.
Simeon Rice was born February 24, 1974, in Chicago, Illinois. He was the second born of five children. His family lived in a 5 bedroom house on Chicago’s south side. His father worked on the assembly line at Ford Motor Company and his mother was a Special Education school teacher who worked with troubled children.

Rice first became interested in football while playing pickup games with his brother in their neighborhood. His father knew that his son had the physical gifts of speed, size and strength to be a great athlete, but he insisted that Simeon understand the importance of hard work. When the time came for Simeon to attend high school, his parents sent him to Mt. Carmel, an all-boys Catholic school about an hour from where the Rice family lived. The school had a history of winning state championships. The school was so successful that the University of Notre Dame was consistently making recruiting visits.

Rice began his career at Mt. Carmel as a running back. The roster was so deep that Coach Frank Lenti moved Simeon to tight end and defensive end before his junior season. Simeon fought the move, purposely dropping passes and missing tackles in practice. He still did not see much action in games. Before his senior season, Coach Lenti had a talk with Simeon and told him there was still time to be great at football, but he had to accept that he was better suited for defense. His senior season, he got better with every game, starting with the first game of the season against Joliet Catholic and their star running back, Mike Alstott. In the state championship game, with Mt. Carmel trailing, Simeon had a sack that caused a turnover which gave the team the momentum to mount a comeback victory. Throughout the season, Coach Lenti advocated for schools to recruit Simeon, but few listened. Simeon wound up at the University of Illinois for college.

College career
After three days of practice, University of Illinois defensive coordinator Denny Marcin told Rice’s parents that their son was destined for greatness. He knew what greatness looked like after coaching Lawrence Taylor at North Carolina. In the third game of the season, Rice sacked Houston quarterback Jimmy Klingler three times and was named ABC’s Player of the Game. That season, he had 9 sacks, a school record for a freshman and was voted the Big Ten rookie of the year. Simeon’s sophomore season was a disappointment for him and the team. Meanwhile, he studied hard and picked up extra credits in an attempt to graduate early. His junior season the team finished 6-5. Rice was a member of what was considered the best linebacker group in the country. His fellow linebacker Dana Howard won the Butkus award for best linebacker in the country. Kevin Hardy, another linebacker on the team, was named the team MVP. Rice had 16 sacks, a school record, and was named a 2nd team All-American. Perhaps his finest game of the season was against Washington State. He had 5 sacks, blocked a field goal, and recovered a fumble. By November, teams were devising special blocking schemes to keep Rice out of the backfield.

After the season, Mel Kiper of ESPN said that Simeon may be the top pick in the draft if he decided to leave school early. His head coach Lou Tepper called around to NFL teams that said that if Rice was selected in the first round, it would not be until the later half. With this information, Rice decided to stay for his senior year. The school attempted to create buzz for Rice to be considered for the Heisman Trophy, but that buzz was killed by their inability to score points. The team finished 5-5-1, but Simeon had another fine season with 12.5 sacks. That season, he became the Big Ten’s all-time sack leader and finished his degree on time. His intelligence, maturity, an unquestioned ability to rush the quarterback and a 4.5 second time in the 40 yard dash made Rice a sure-fire first round draft choice.

Pre-Draft

He attended the NFL Combine and was measured at 6'4" and weighing 259 pounds. After claiming he could run a 4.5 40-yard dash, he was timed as running it in 4.66 seconds.

Professional career

Arizona Cardinals
In the 1996 NFL draft, Simeon Rice was selected third overall by the Arizona Cardinals. He was selected after Keyshawn Johnson and Kevin Hardy. After a contract dispute that lasted through training camp, Rice signed a 4-year, $9.5 million deal. Lining up at defensive end, Rice’s first snap as a pro resulted in a tackle for a 2-yard loss on Indianapolis Colts running back Marshall Faulk. At the end of September, Rice had 5 sacks and was named NFL defensive rookie of the month. At the end of the season, Rice had 12.5 sacks which tied a rookie record and he was voted NFL Defensive Rookie of the Year by the Associated Press. In Rice’s second season with the Cardinals, they finished 4-12. The fans grew impatient with the team. Rice himself lost the admiration of the fans by playing semi-professional basketball for the Philadelphia Power of the USBL. He played 11 minutes a game averaging 2.5 points and was paid $400 a game. In Rice’s third season, the Cardinals made the playoffs and won their first post-season game since 1947. That season Rice had 10 sacks, 23 quarterback pressures, and 4 fumble recoveries. The following year, the team slipped to 6-10 in part because of injuries to many of their star players. Despite the team’s poor play, Rice had 16.5 sacks and was named to his first Pro-Bowl. The next season, the year 2000, Rice was due a big pay increase, but the contract negotiation kept him off the field until the second game of the regular season. Rice had 7.5 sacks and the Cardinals fell to 3-13. At the end of the season, Rice was a free agent and was anxious to go to a new team.

Tampa Bay Buccaneers
The Tampa Bay Buccaneers signed Rice to a 5-year deal worth more than $30 million. He joined a defense that carried Tampa Bay to the playoffs the year before. His first season as a Buccaneer, Rice had 64 tackles and 11 sacks and the Buccaneers made the playoffs, but fell to the Philadelphia Eagles, 31-9. After the loss, head coach Tony Dungy was fired. The Buccaneers traded two 1st round picks and two 2nd round picks to the Oakland Raiders for Jon Gruden. Gruden’s high-energy style and the addition of Keenan McCardell and Michael Pittman to the offense helped the Buccaneers reach the Super Bowl. They beat the Oakland Raiders 48-21 for the first Super Bowl victory in the Tampa Bay Buccaneers' history. Rice had 5 tackles and 2 sacks in the Super Bowl and 15.5 sacks on the season, including 11 sacks in a 5-game span. Over the next 3 seasons, the Buccaneers only had one with a winning record and lost the only playoff appearance they had. Rice had impressive seasons, recording 15, 12, and 14 sacks. The 2006 season saw the Buccaneers fall to 4-12 and Rice only had 2 sacks in 8 games played. He finished the second half of the season on injured reserve and was released by the Buccaneers before the start of the next season because of a failed physical.

2007
Rice played 8 games for the Denver Broncos with 5 tackles and no sacks and 2 games for the Indianapolis Colts with one sack. He has not played in the NFL since.

Rice left the NFL as the active leader in sacks with 122. He is currently 20th all-time in sacks in NFL history. Rice was also the second fastest player to achieve 100 career sacks behind Eagles and Packers legend Reggie White.

New York Sentinels
After sitting out the 2008 season, Rice signed with the New York Sentinels of the United Football League on August 27, 2009.

NFL career statistics

Regular season

Postseason

Music and film career
After football, Rice began a career in the entertainment industry. He started his own Hip-Hop/R&B record label, named "Lucid Dream Entertainment." Yashi Rice, his younger sister and Legends Football League player, was his first signee. Yashi has released her first single, titled "Serious." He also appeared in Slum Village video "Climax" along with Saafir and Gary Coleman.  A 2009 graduate of the New York Film Academy, Rice premiered his first short film as director, "When I Was King," two days before the Super Bowl XLV in Dallas.

Rice's first feature-length film as director, Unsullied, was released on August 28, 2015. The film stars Murray Gray, Rusty Joiner and James Gaudioso.

For the 2021 season, Rice joined WTSP in Tampa, Florida as a co-host for their pregame show "The Blitz"

Personal life
Rice's son Jordan Caroline is a professional basketball player for Kaohsiung Jeoutai Technology. He played college ball at Nevada.

References

External links
Lucid Dream Entertainment
Indianapolis Colts bio
United Football League bio

1974 births
Living people
Players of American football from Chicago
American football defensive ends
Illinois Fighting Illini football players
Arizona Cardinals players
Tampa Bay Buccaneers players
Denver Broncos players
Indianapolis Colts players
New York Sentinels players
National Football League Defensive Rookie of the Year Award winners
National Conference Pro Bowl players
New York Film Academy alumni
United States Basketball League players
100 Sacks Club